Corporación Bananera Nacional (CORBANA) is a non-governmental institution in Costa Rica supporting the national banana industry.

CORBANA was established in 1971 to develop the banana industry and to serve banana producers.

CORBANA provides technical assistance to the Government of Costa Rica, promotes scientific research to improve banana farming, operates a fund to provide capital to producers, and compiles national and international banana production and consumption figures for the industry and government. 

CORBANA is funded by the government and by banana producers.

References

External links 
 Corporación Bananera Nacional website 

Agricultural organizations based in Costa Rica